White Canyon may refer to:

 White Canyon (San Juan County, Utah), a canyon in the United States that is known for several large natural bridges
 White Canyon (roller coaster), a former roller coaster at the Yomiuriland amusement park near Inagi, Tokyo, Japan
 Premonstratensians, The Order of Canons Regular of Prémontré, also known as the Premonstratensians, the Norbertines and, in Britain and Ireland, as the White Canons